Aaye Kuch Abr is a poem written by famous Urdu poet Faiz Ahmad Faiz. It was written during Faiz's life of isolation and separation, while he was lodged in Hyderabad Central Jail during the Rawalpindi conspiracy case. He was away from his wife and two daughters. After being separated from his family, Faiz spent months without seeing them. A few steps ahead of time, Faiz found himself misunderstood in the society in which he lived. Aaye Kuch Abr took this step in Faiz's life but he stands with hope.

2011 version 

In 2011, this ghazal was performed (composed and sung) by Mehdi Hassan.

2019 version 

Later, It was sung by Atif Aslam during Coke Studio season 12 episode 6 (finale), directed by Rohail Hyatt. The video was released on 27 November 2019 by Coke Studio on YouTube. It features Atif Aslam. The music video garnered over a million views in two hours of its release. It has received over 6 million on YouTubeas of August 2020.

Reception 
Atif said about it that before you even touch a piece like this, you think twice. But the legends' work is not meant to be feared. Faiz Sir's way of writing is very distinctive and our minds can't truly know his poetry." Aadeez expressed their love foAccording to Coke Studio, the ghazal lashed out at Aadeez.

Credits 

 Artists: Begum Akhter (original) Mehdi Hassan (original), Atif Aslam
(Bangladeshi singar), Runa Laila
 Composed by: Mehdi Hassan
 Poetry by: Faiz Ahmad Faiz
 Directed and Produced by: Rohail Hyatt
 Music label: Coke Studio

References 

2011 songs
Atif Aslam songs
Coke Studio (Pakistani TV program)
Urdu-language songs
Poetry by Faiz Ahmad Faiz